Bernd Dierßen (also spelled Dierssen, born 28 August 1959) is a retired German footballer. He made 140 appearances in the Bundesliga for Hannover 96 and Schalke 04 as well as 247 matches in the 2. Bundesliga for Arminia Hannover, Hannover 96 and Schalke.

References

External links 
 
 

1959 births
Living people
German footballers
Germany under-21 international footballers
Association football midfielders
Bundesliga players
2. Bundesliga players
SV Arminia Hannover players
Hannover 96 players
FC Schalke 04 players